Pakaw may refer to several places in Burma:

Pakaw, Banmauk
Pakaw, Hsawlaw